Saint John's Episcopal Church is a Los Angeles Historic-Cultural Monument located in the Wilmington section of Los Angeles, California, near the Port of Los Angeles.  Built in 1883, it is the oldest church building in the harbor area that is still used for regular worship services.  It was moved to its present site in 1943.

See also
 List of Los Angeles Historic-Cultural Monuments in the Harbor area

References

Churches in Los Angeles
Episcopal church buildings in California
Wilmington, Los Angeles
Churches completed in 1883
19th-century Episcopal church buildings
Los Angeles Historic-Cultural Monuments
Victorian architecture in California
Carpenter Gothic church buildings in California
1883 establishments in California